Charles N.O. Mordi is a Nigerian economist and former head of research at the Central Bank of Nigeria. He is an authority on the monetary economics of Nigeria.

Education and career
Mordi holds a BSc and M.Sc., both in economics, from the University of Lagos.

His professional career began at the Central Bank of Nigeria in 1980. He then proceeded to the IMF where he became a country economist on the economies of Namibia and Botswana. He was also a member of IMF surveillance missions to Malawi and Lesotho.

Mordi has conducted research on the demand for money in the Nigerian economy.

Journal articles

References

Living people
Nigerian economists
Nigerian social scientists
Central Bank of Nigeria economists
University of Lagos alumni
Year of birth missing (living people)